Historias de Mi Tierra is a studio album released by Mexican performer Pepe Aguilar. It was released in October 18, 2005 by Sony BMG. Aguilar was awarded the Best Mexican/Mexican-American Album at the 49th Grammy Awards and Best Ranchero Album at the Latin Grammy Awards of 2006.

Track listing

Chart performance

Sales and certifications

References

2005 albums
Pepe Aguilar albums
Spanish-language albums
Latin Grammy Award for Best Ranchero/Mariachi Album
Grammy Award for Best Mexican/Mexican-American Album